In machine learning, a nearest centroid classifier or nearest prototype classifier is a classification model that assigns to observations the label of the class of training samples whose mean (centroid) is closest to the observation. When applied to text classification using word vectors containing tf*idf weights to represent documents, the nearest centroid classifier is known as the Rocchio classifier because of its similarity to the Rocchio algorithm for relevance feedback.

An extended version of the nearest centroid classifier has found applications in the medical domain, specifically classification of tumors.

Algorithm

Training
Given labeled training samples  with class labels , compute the per-class centroids  where  is the set of indices of samples belonging to class .

Prediction

See also 
 Cluster hypothesis
 k-means clustering
 k-nearest neighbor algorithm
 Linear discriminant analysis

References 

Classification algorithms